Terralba is a comune (municipality) and former Latin Catholic bishopric in the Province of Oristano in the Italian island region Sardinia, located about  northwest of Cagliari and about  south of Oristano.

Terralba borders the following municipalities: Arborea, Arbus, Guspini, Marrubiu, San Nicolò d'Arcidano and Uras.

References

External links

 Official website

Cities and towns in Sardinia